Sasca Montană is a commune in Caraș-Severin County, western Romania with a population of 1887 people. It is composed of five villages: Bogodinț (Bogorfalva), Potoc (Potok), Sasca Montană, Sasca Română (Szászka) and Slatina-Nera (Néraszlatina).

References

Communes in Caraș-Severin County
Localities in Romanian Banat
Mining communities in Romania